Csaba Fajkusz (born 13 September 1967) is a Hungarian gymnast. He competed at the 1988 Summer Olympics and the 1992 Summer Olympics.

References

1967 births
Living people
Hungarian male artistic gymnasts
Olympic gymnasts of Hungary
Gymnasts at the 1988 Summer Olympics
Gymnasts at the 1992 Summer Olympics
Sportspeople from Győr